Annovka is a rural locality (a village) in Kanly-Turkeyevsky Selsoviet, Buzdyaksky District, Bashkortostan, Russia. The population was 482 as of 2010. There is 1 street.

Geography 
Annovka is located 24 km south of Buzdyak (the district's administrative centre) by road. Kanly-Turkeyevo is the nearest rural locality.

References 

Rural localities in Buzdyaksky District